In the Fall Quarter of 1988, several freshmen organized a Freshman Choir at Cunningham Hall of Oakwood College, Alabama. Among the organizers were Johnny Ramsey, Gerald Morgan, Brian Clifton, Michael Darville, Patrick and Paul Graham, Bobby Anderson, Robert Bell, and Owen Simons. Owen Simons was the first director. At the end of the school year, the freshman choir changed its name to Rejoice. After much discussion, the name Dynamic Praise was decided upon during the fall of 1989.

In the Spring Semester of 1996, Owen Simons handed the choir leadership over to Andrew Young, affectionately known as Benji. Benji directed the choir until 2011, after which Dynamic Praise came under the direction of Bruce Bean. In 2016, Bean announced he would be stepping down as choir director. Currently, Dynamic Praise is led by Oakwood University alum, Bryce Davis. His mission is to continue the legacy of Dynamic Praise in any way possible. 

The choir has traveled across the country and into the international waters. Dynamic Praise has shared the stage with such artists as Richard Smallwood, Kirk Franklin, Yolanda Adams, Donnie McClurkin, CeCe Winans, Dottie Peoples, Byron Cage, Lamar Campbell, Jonathan Nelson, Dathan Thigpen, Kelly Price, and many more. The choir also has alumnus roster consisting of such artist as Take 6, Virtue, Sean Simmonds, Duawne Starling, Carmen Hope, Lee Cort, Committed and Grandpa Cletus.

Discography

Album

Filmography

DVD

American gospel musical groups
Musical groups established in 1988